Đorđe Vujkov (born 19 August 1955) is a former Yugoslav and Serbian footballer who played as a defender.

Career
Vujkov spent 10 seasons with Vojvodina from 1973 to 1983, winning the Mitropa Cup in 1976–77. He later played abroad in Belgium (Lokeren), Spain (Castellón), and Austria (DSV Alpine).

In 1977, Vujkov was capped four times for Yugoslavia at full level. He was also a member of the under-21 team that won the UEFA Under-21 Championship in 1978.

Honours

Club
Vojvodina
 Mitropa Cup: 1976–77

International
Yugoslavia
 UEFA Under-21 Championship: 1978
 UEFA Under-18 Championship: Runner-up 1974

References

External links
 
 
 
 

Association football defenders
Austrian Football Bundesliga players
Belgian Pro League players
CD Castellón footballers
Expatriate footballers in Austria
Expatriate footballers in Belgium
Expatriate footballers in Spain
FK Vojvodina players
K.S.C. Lokeren Oost-Vlaanderen players
People from Titel
Segunda División players
Serbian footballers
Yugoslav expatriate footballers
Yugoslav expatriates in Austria
Yugoslav expatriates in Belgium
Yugoslav expatriates in Spain
Yugoslav First League players
Yugoslav footballers
Yugoslavia international footballers
Yugoslavia under-21 international footballers
1955 births
Living people